Equivalence or Equivalent may refer to:

Arts and entertainment
Album-equivalent unit, a measurement unit in the music industry
Equivalence class (music)
Equivalent VIII, or The Bricks, a minimalist sculpture by Carl Andre 
Equivalents, a series of photographs of clouds by Alfred Stieglitz

Language
Dynamic and formal equivalence in translation
Equivalence (formal languages)

Law
The doctrine of equivalents in patent law
The equivalence principle as if impacts on the direct effect of European Union law

Logic
Logical equivalence, where two statements are logically equivalent if they have the same logical content
Material equivalence, a relationship where the truth of either one of the connected statements requires the truth of the other

Science and technology

Chemistry
Equivalent (chemistry)
Equivalence point
Equivalent weight

Computing
Turing equivalence (theory of computation), or Turing completeness
Semantic equivalence in computer metadata

Economics
Certainty equivalent, a principle related to risk premium
Economic equivalence, a concept in engineering economics 
Ricardian equivalence, or Ricardo–de Viti–Barro equivalence, a proposition in economics

Mathematics
Equality (mathematics)
Equivalence relation
Equivalence class
Equivalence of categories, in category theory
Equivalent infinitesimal
Matrix equivalence in linear algebra
Turing equivalence (recursion theory)

Physics
Equivalence principle in the theory of general relativity

Other uses
Equivalence (trade)
Moral equivalence, a term used in political debate
The Equivalent, a sum paid from England to Scotland at their Union in 1707

See also 

≡ (disambiguation)
Equivalency, a National Collegiate Athletic Association concept